Randy Kamp (born August 30, 1953) is a Canadian politician based in British Columbia. He was a Conservative Member of Parliament from 2004 to 2015.

Early life and education
Born in Salmon Arm, British Columbia, Kamp grew up in Maple Ridge, British Columbia and graduated from Maple Ridge Secondary School in 1971. He studied at Simon Fraser University in theology and earned a Bachelor of Arts. He then studied linguistics at the graduate level.

Ministry
From 1985 to 1992, he and his family lived in the Philippines where he was regional director for an organization doing linguistic work among minority language groups. Kamp was Pastor of Maple Ridge Church Baptist Church, member of the Fellowship of Evangelical Baptist Churches in Canada, until 1997.

Politics
In 1997, Kamp was hired as the executive assistant to Grant McNally, the Member of Parliament for the Dewdney—Alouette riding from 1997 to 2004.

When McNally retired, Kamp decided to run for Parliament, and was elected as the Member of Parliament for Dewdney—Alouette during the 2004 federal election. In his first term, Kamp was promoted to the position of Official Opposition Critic for Fisheries and Oceans on the Pacific Coast and was elected Chair of the Conservative Crystal Meth Task Force.

On January 23, 2006, Kamp was re-elected to the House of Commons as the member for Pitt Meadows—Maple Ridge—Mission as his riding was now called. Shortly thereafter, Prime Minister Stephen Harper appointed Kamp as the Parliamentary Secretary to the Minister of Fisheries and Oceans, Loyola Hearn. He was concurrently a member of the Standing Committee on Fisheries and Oceans.

Kamp voted in favor of motion 312, Stephen Woodworth's private member's bill that would have had Canada reexamine at what time human life begins.

Kamp has been married to his wife Ruth for over thirty years, and they have three adult children and four grandchildren.

On January 31, 2015, Kamp announced that he would retire and not stand as a candidate in the next election, widely expected to occur in October 2015.

Election history

|-

 
|New Democratic
|Craig Speirs 
|align="right"|18,835
|align="right"|35.53%
|align="right"|+2.52
|align="right"|
|-

|Liberal
|Mandeep Bhuller
|align="right"|2,739
|align="right"|5.17%
|align="right"|-1.46
|align="right"|

|- bgcolor="white"
!align="right" colspan=3|Total valid votes
!align="right"|53,006
!align="right"|100.00%
!align="right"|
!align="right"|
|- bgcolor="white"
!align="right" colspan=3|Total rejected ballots
!align="right"|158
!align="right"|0.3%
!align="right"|
!align="right"|
|- bgcolor="white"
!align="right" colspan=3|Turnout
!align="right"|56,164
!align="right"|60.04%
!align="right"|
!align="right"|

|-

 
|New Democratic
|Mike Bocking
|align="right"|16,894
|align="right"|33.0%
|align="right"|
|align="right"|
|-

|Liberal
|Dan Olson
|align="right"|3,394
|align="right"|6.6%
|align="right"|
|align="right"|

|- bgcolor="white"
!align="right" colspan=3|Total valid votes
!align="right"|51171
!align="right"|99.7%
!align="right"|
!align="right"|
|- bgcolor="white"
!align="right" colspan=3|Total rejected ballots
!align="right"|137
!align="right"|0.3%
!align="right"|
!align="right"|
|- bgcolor="white"
!align="right" colspan=3|Turnout
!align="right"|51308
!align="right"|60.2%
!align="right"|
!align="right"|

|-

 
|New Democratic
|Mike Bocking 
|align="right"|18,225
|align="right"|34.96%
|align="right"|
|align="right"|$62,086.56
|-

|Liberal
|Keith Henry
|align="right"|10,556
|align="right"|20.25%
|align="right"|
|align="right"|$42,446.84

|Independent
|Erin Knipstrom
|align="right"|277
|align="right"|0.53%
|align="right"|
|align="right"|

|- bgcolor="white"
!align="right" colspan=3|Total valid votes
!align="right"|52,120
!align="right"|100.00%
!align="right"|
!align="right"|
|- bgcolor="white"
!align="right" colspan=3|Total rejected ballots
!align="right"|128
!align="right"|
!align="right"|
!align="right"|
|- bgcolor="white"
!align="right" colspan=3|Turnout
!align="right"|52,248
!align="right"|64.1%
!align="right"|
!align="right"|

|-

 
|New Democratic
|Mike Bocking
|align="right"|15,693
|align="right"|32.68%
|align="right"|
|align="right"|$34,357
|-

|Liberal
|Blanche Juneau
|align="right"|10,500
|align="right"|21.86%
|align="right"|
|align="right"|$14,179

|No affiliation
|Scott Etches
|align="right"|1,156
|align="right"|1.66%
|align="right"|
|align="right"|$707
|- bgcolor="white"
!align="right" colspan=3|Total valid votes
!align="right"|48,016
!align="right"|100.00%
!align="right"|
!align="right"|
|- bgcolor="white"
!align="right" colspan=3|Total rejected ballots
!align="right"|125
!align="right"|0.26%
!align="right"|
!align="right"|
|- bgcolor="white"
!align="right" colspan=3|Turnout
!align="right"|48,141
!align="right"|62.29%
!align="right"|
!align="right"|

References

External links

 

1953 births
Canadian Baptists
Canadian clergy
Conservative Party of Canada MPs
Living people
Members of the House of Commons of Canada from British Columbia
People from Maple Ridge, British Columbia
People from Salmon Arm
Simon Fraser University alumni
21st-century Canadian politicians